The bird formerly known as slaty thrush has been split into two species:
 Andean slaty thrush, Turdus nigriceps
 Blacksmith thrush, Turdus subalaris